Teen Titans: The Lost Annual is a 2008 one-shot, from DC Comics, written by Bob Haney, with art by Jay Stephens and Mike Allred.

Plot
An alien race known as the Ullustrian kidnaps American President John F. Kennedy and brings him back to Ullustra so that he can lead them in a war against their enemies the Violators. To keep the American public from becoming alarmed, they replace Kennedy with a shape-shifting duplicate. Robin learns of the switch and alerts the Teen Titans. They travel to Ulustra only to discover that Kennedy has been brainwashed into helping the Ullustrians. The Ullustrians plan on returning Kennedy to Earth once the war is over, but until then, they require his leadership expertise. Robin, Kid Flash and Speedy fight on behalf of the Ullustrians, but Wonder Girl turns against them and fights on the side of their enemies, the Violators. She briefly falls in love with a Violator teen named Zora, until she discovers that he already has three wives. Robin finds a way to get Kennedy to break free of the mind control and rescue him. They return to Earth with the President, but when they arrive, they discover that Kennedy's doppelganger has been assassinated in Dallas, Texas. The real Kennedy cannot risk publicly revealing himself without alerting the American people to the existence of aliens, so he returns to Ullustra voluntarily and becomes a space-faring freedom fighter.

Production

The original Teen Titans go into space to save John F. Kennedy. It was originally planned for release in 2003 as the Teen Titans Swingin' Elseworlds Special, but its release was cancelled even though the book was finished. DC released the book in January 2008 as a "Lost Annual".

References

2008 comics debuts
2008 comics endings
Elseworlds titles
One-shot comic titles
Teen Titans titles
Works about the assassination of John F. Kennedy
Cultural depictions of John F. Kennedy
Comics by Bob Haney
Comics set in the United States
Comics set in the 1960s
Fiction set in 1963
Dallas in fiction